Saint-Germain-de-Confolens (literally Saint-Germain of Confolens) is a former commune in the Charente department in western France. On 1 January 2016, it was merged into the commune Confolens.

Population

See also
Communes of the Charente department

References

Former communes of Charente
Charente communes articles needing translation from French Wikipedia